Dušan Kosič (born 23 April 1971) is a Slovenian professional football manager and former player who is the head coach of Slovenian PrvaLiga club Tabor Sežana.

Club career
Kosič is the second-most capped player in the Slovenian PrvaLiga with 421 appearances and had the most appearances for Olimpija (234), winning three Slovenian Cups and one Slovenian Supercup with the club. He also won the cup with Rudar Velenje in 1998.

International career
Kosič made five appearances for the Slovenia national team between 1992 and 1994.

Managerial career
Between 2006 and 2017, Kosič managed ATUS Ferlach, Olimpija Ljubljana, Triglav Kranj, and the Slovenia under-17 national team. 

In August 2017, he was appointed as manager of Celje. In the 2019–20 season, Celje won their first-ever Slovenian championship. For this achievement, Kosič received the Slovenian Manager of the Year award, presented by the Slovenian newspaper EkipaSN. However, he left the club on 21 December 2020 after Celje finished the first part of the 2020–21 season in seventh place.

On 9 September 2021, Kosič was appointed as manager of Tabor Sežana, signing a contract until 2023.

Honours

Player
Olimpija
Slovenian Cup: 1995–96, 1999–2000, 2002–03
Slovenian Supercup: 1995

Rudar Velenje
Slovenian Cup: 1997–98

Manager
Celje
Slovenian PrvaLiga: 2019–20

Personal
Slovenian Manager of the Year: 2020

References

External links

Profile at NZS 

1971 births
Living people
Footballers from Ljubljana
Slovenian footballers
Association football midfielders
Slovenian expatriate footballers
NK Svoboda Ljubljana players
NK Krka players
NK Beltinci players
NK Olimpija Ljubljana (1945–2005) players
NK Rudar Velenje players
Slovenian PrvaLiga players
Expatriate footballers in Austria
Slovenian expatriate sportspeople in Austria
NK Olimpija Ljubljana (2005) managers
NK Celje managers
Slovenia international footballers
Slovenian football managers
Competitors at the 1993 Mediterranean Games
Slovenian expatriate football managers
Expatriate football managers in Austria
Mediterranean Games competitors for Slovenia